The Great Turf Mystery is a 1924 British silent sports film directed by Walter West and starring Violet Hopson, James Knight and Warwick Ward. Like many of West's films it has a horseracing theme.

Cast
 Violet Hopson as Sheila Donovan  
 James Knight as Luke Pomeroy  
 Warwick Ward as Frank Pomeroy  
 Marjorie Benson as Maisie  
 Arthur Walcott as Mark Goodman 
 M. Evans as James Goodman

References

Bibliography
 Low, Rachel. The History of British Film: Volume IV, 1918–1929. Routledge, 1997.

External links

1924 films
British horse racing films
British silent feature films
1920s sports films
Films directed by Walter West
British black-and-white films
1920s English-language films
1920s British films
Silent sports films